12th & I station is an at-grade light rail station on the Blue Line of the Sacramento RT Light Rail system operated by the Sacramento Regional Transit District. The station is located alongside 12th Street at its intersection with I Street, after which the station is named, in the city of Sacramento, California.

Due to the tracks running in both directions on a one-way thoroughfare (12th Street is one-way southbound), wheelchair users can only access northbound trains from the adjacent curbside platform. 

The stops are located adjacent to the former Sacramento Union Station, where Sacramento Northern Railroad interchanged with Central California Traction Company interurban services.

References

Sacramento Regional Transit light rail stations
Railway stations in the United States opened in 1987